Helianthus exilis is a species of sunflower known by the common name serpentine sunflower. It is endemic to northern California (from Siskiyou County south to Napa County and Nevada County), where it grows mainly in mountainous areas, often in serpentine soils.

Helianthus exilis is an erect annual reaching heights over a meter (40 inches)). It has a hairy, rough stem with leaves lance- or oval-shaped, usually pointed, sometimes serrated along the edges, and 3 to 15 centimeters (1.2-6.0 inches) long. The inflorescence holds one or more flower heads, and each plant may have many inflorescences growing along the full length of the stem. The flower head has a cup of long, pointed phyllaries holding an array of bright yellow ray florets each one to two centimeters (0.4-0.8 inches) long around a center of yellow to dark purple or reddish disc florets. The achene is 3 to 5 millimeters (0.12-0.20 inches) long.

References

External links
 C.Michael Hogan, ed. 2010.  Helianthus bolanderi. Encyclopedia of Life
 Jepson Manual Treatment

Endemic flora of California
exilis
Plants described in 1865